Valeri Pavlovich Dikarev (born September 10, 1939 in Baku, died in 2001) was a Soviet football player.

Honours
 Soviet Top League winner: 1962.
 Soviet Cup winner: 1963, 1965.

International career
Dikaryov made his debut for USSR on October 11, 1964 in a friendly against Austria. He played in a 1966 FIFA World Cup qualifier, but was not selected for the final tournament squad.

External links
  Profile

Russian footballers
Soviet footballers
Soviet Union international footballers
Soviet Top League players
FC Spartak Moscow players
FC Lokomotiv Moscow players
1939 births
2001 deaths
FC Torpedo NN Nizhny Novgorod players
Association football defenders
Neftçi PFK players